Philyra may refer to:

Greek mythology
Philyra (mythology), was the name of several figures in Greek mythology, including:
Philyra (Oceanid), an Oceanid nymph and mother by Cronus of Chiron
Philyra, one of the names given to the wife of Nauplius, who was the father of Palamedes.
Philyra or Phillyra, daughter of the river Asopus, and the mother of Hypseus by Peneius

Organisms
Philyra (crustacean), a genus of decapod in family Leucosiidae
Philyra (plant), a genus of flowering plant in the spurge family
Philyra (EP), an EP by the Mountain Goats